Woodland High School is a high school in Woodland, California, United States. It enrolls students in 9th through 12th grade.

Notable alumni

 Jillian Camarena, Olympic shot put competitor
 Vicente Escobedo, Olympic boxer, professional boxer under Golden Boy Promotions
 Hunter Moore, website creator, hacker, and convicted felon
 Alyssa Nakken, the first female Major League Baseball coach
 Dustin Pedroia, professional baseball player
 Chris Vargas, professional football player
 Craig Penrose, professional football player
 Jack Yerman, Olympic gold medalist in track and field

References

External links
 

Public high schools in California
Schools in Yolo County, California
Buildings and structures in Woodland, California